The 1996 NCAA Division I Field Hockey Championship was the 16th women's collegiate field hockey tournament organized by the National Collegiate Athletic Association, to determine the top college field hockey team in the United States. The North Carolina Tar Heels won their third championship, defeating the Princeton Tigers in the final. The championship rounds were held at the Boston College Field Hockey Field in Chestnut Hill, Massachusetts on the campus of Boston College.

Bracket

References 

1996
Field Hockey
1996 in women's field hockey
1996 in sports in Massachusetts
Women's sports in Massachusetts